In United States military terminology, a high-value target (HVT) is the term given to a person or resource that an enemy commander requires to complete a mission. The term has been widely used in the news media for Osama Bin Laden and high-ranking officers of Al-Qaeda. Former Iraqi President Saddam Hussein was known as High Value Target Number One by the United States military before his capture.

A high-payoff target, also known as an HPT, is a high-value target whose loss to the enemy will significantly contribute to the success of a friendly course of action.

Soldiers are often asked to do all that is possible to capture an HVT alive but, if that is impossible, they are given clearance to fire. Various tasked Joint Special Operations Task Forces (Task Force 145, Task Force 121, Task Force 11) have been established for the main purposes of capturing or killing these high-value targets. Forces assigned to these include units mainly from the Joint Special Operations Command  and SOCOM such as the US Navy SEALs, US Army Delta Force, US Navy SEAL Team Six, US Army 75th Ranger Regiment and elements of the British Army's Special Air Service (SAS). The term has also become associated with secret US Department of Defense programs to capture and subsequently interrogate terrorist leaders.

See also
High-value detention site
Manhunt (military)
Task Force 6-26
Operation Red Dawn
Ayman al-Zawahiri
USA kill or capture strategy in Iraq

Notes

External links
 United States Department of Defense definition High-Value Target (HVT) — A target the enemy commander requires for the successful completion of the mission. The loss of HVTs would be expected to seriously degrade important enemy functions throughout the friendly commander's area of interest. See also high-payoff target; target. (JP 3-09)
Bin Laden Trail 'Stone Cold' Washington Post September 10, 2006

Targeting (warfare)
Intelligence operations by type
Military terminology
Operations involving special forces